History with Lourd is a 30-minute documentary show about history lessons. It airs every Saturday at 10:00-10:30 PM on TV5 and AksyonTV.

Episodes

References

Lists of Philippine television series episodes
Lists of documentary television series episodes